, is a Zen Buddhist temple located near the Shugakuin Imperial Villa at Sakyō-ku, Ichijo-ji, Kotani-cho, in northeast Kyoto, Japan. It is famous for its fall foliage and Suikinkutsu.

See also 
 List of Buddhist temples in Kyoto

External links 
 
 Official website
 Enkō-ji on Kultur-in-Asien.de: Teil 1 - Teil 2 - Teil 3 - Teil 4

Buddhist temples in Kyoto
Nanzen-ji temples
Rinzai temples